Sterigmapetalum is a genus of flowering plants belonging to the family Rhizophoraceae.

Its native range is Southern America.

Species:

Sterigmapetalum chrysophyllum 
Sterigmapetalum colombianum 
Sterigmapetalum exappendiculatum 
Sterigmapetalum guianense 
Sterigmapetalum heterodoxum 
Sterigmapetalum obovatum 
Sterigmapetalum plumbeum 
Sterigmapetalum resinosum 
Sterigmapetalum tachirense

References

Rhizophoraceae
Malpighiales genera